The common torrent hawk, (Epophthalmia vittata) is a species of dragonfly in the family Macromiidae. It is found in India, Sri Lanka, and Indonesia. Three subspecies recognized.

Subspecies
 Epophthalmia vittata cyanocephala – from Sri Lanka
 Epophthalmia vittata vittata – from India
 Epophthalmia vittata sundana – from Indonesia

Description and habitat
It is a moderately sized dragonfly with bluish-green eyes and dark brown thorax, marked with yellow stripes on the sides. Its abdomen is dark reddish-brown with yellow annules on segment 1 to 9. The species breeds in weedy tanks and ponds. Adults can be found far away from breeding habitats. It soars tirelessly during daytime high up, occasionally in small swarms.

See also
 List of odonates of Sri Lanka
 List of odonates of India
 List of odonata of Kerala

References

 vittata.html World Dragonflies
 Animal diversity web
 Query Results

External links

Macromiidae
Taxa named by Hermann Burmeister
Insects described in 1839